Bandung High Tech Valley (BHTV) is an initiative to foster technology-based business and industries in Bandung region. It aims to be the Silicon Valley of Indonesia.

The BHTV initiative was originated from Ministry of Industry and Trade of Indonesia as a mean to increase electronics export. It was started in 1986, but was forgotten when Indonesia faced economy crisis in 1997. It was then restarted by some people in Institut Teknologi Bandung.

Location
Bandung is chosen for the project because it has been known to have research centers and educations in technology and science through Institut Teknologi Bandung, founded during the Dutch East Indies period in 1920. In the course of time, graduated students and researchers from the university have contributed into the development in several technology-based companies located in Bandung. That includes PT Telkom (telecommunication company: the headquarters and research center), PT Inti (electronics and telecommunication manufacturer), LEN (National Electronic Institute), Omedata (IC bonding and packaging), PT Dirgantara Indonesia (formerly IPTN, the only aircraft industry in Indonesia), PT Kereta Api Indonesia (state-owned railroad and train production company) and several small local companies.

History
The main focus of current BHTV initiative is to help small tech companies to start in Bandung. Another activity is to attract multinational companies to invest in research and development in the region. Talks have been initiated with some big and small companies.

In 2004, there was a BHTV expo, in which 70 companies (mostly in IT) took part.

On February 10, 2006, BHTV Foundation has been legally founded by four ITB faculty members to further oversee the development of BHTV.

References

External links
 Official site

Economy of Indonesia